The 1998 True Value 500 was the fourth round of the 1998 Indy Racing League season. The race was held on June 6, 1998, at the  Texas Motor Speedway in Fort Worth, Texas.

Report

Qualifying

Two laps qualifying. The worst lap from any of the drivers were not published, and therefore are unknown. Rain delayed qualifying from Thursday to Friday.

Failed to qualify or withdrew
 Johnny Unser for Hemelgarn Racing - subbed for  Buddy Lazier, who suffered from a stomach illness, in practice sessions on Thursday and was named to qualify the car before it was delayed.
 Jimmy Kite for Team Scandia - The team scaled back its IRL program after Indianapolis to concentrate on NASCAR, and withdrew from the event, along with his #33 entry, initially assigned to  Billy Roe.
 Mike Groff for Byrd-Cunningham Racing - fired prior to the start of practice and replaced by  John Paul Jr., who was due to drive for Team Pelfrey.
 Steve Kinser R for Team Pelfrey - initially named as a replacement for Paul, Jr, he withdrew prior to the start of practice. Replaced by  Tyce Carlson, who was due to drive for Immke Racing.
 Jack Hewitt R for PDM Racing - did not arrive at the track.
 Paul Durant for Cobb Racing - did not arrive at the track.
 Joe Gosek R for Liberty Racing - did not arrive at the track.
The #20 Immke Racing entry was withdrawn after Carlson signed with Team Pelfrey prior to the start of practice.
The #17 Chitwood Motorsports entry, which was vacant on the entry list, did not arrive at the track.

Race

The race was the first IRL event run on the newly reconfigured Texas track, which had undergone changes to the corner banking (eliminating the 8-degree portions, originally intended for Indy events) and the transitions out of the corners, plus a complete repaving and drainage work. The new configuration proved to be extremely fast; Tony Stewart broke the IRL new car qualifying record, and ran laps as fast as 228 MPH during the race, believed to be the fastest laps ever turned on a closed course by a car with a normally aspirated engine.

The start was confusing, as Sam Schmidt did not come up to speed due to an electronics problem and Billy Roe spun through the quad-oval grass at the green flag. This was cleaned up, but only a few green flag laps were registered until Roberto Guerrero spun in front of the pack coming out of turn 2. Rookie Donnie Beechler ran hard into the back of Stéphan Grégoire's car, causing a six-car accident that eliminated Eddie Cheever (fresh off of his Indy 500 victory). Beechler ended sliding upside down the length of the back stretch. No one was hurt. Stewart had to pit for a cut tire after running through debris, handing the lead to Arie Luyendyk. The Dutch lead briefly after the green before being overhauled by Boat on lap 22, while Stewart worked his way up from the rear.

By lap 34, when a caution flew for Eliseo Salazar's blown engine, Luyendyk took a gamble by not pitting, but backfired when he had to pit under green on lap 59 and lost two laps. Mark Dismore had something in the rear of the car break on lap 72 which put him hard into the turn 1 wall, suffering a concussion. Under the subsequent caution, Stewart had to make an extra pit stop for a suspected tire problem and went to the rear again. On the restart, Scott Goodyear got the jump on Boat and took the lead; the two then battled until Boat retook the lead five laps later. By halfway, Boat, Stewart, and Greg Ray were running nose-to-tail and attempting slingshots.

As a caution flew on lap 144, Boat banged wheels with J. J. Yeley. The contact left a large "doughnut" on Boat's left sidepod, but he continued with no apparent problems. Stewart jumped Boat on the restart, while Ray, Goodyear, Jeff Ward and Kenny Bräck diced for third. Unfortunately for Ward, his race ended four laps later with engine failure. Stewart had his left sidepod radiator rupture streaked down the front stretch on lap 177, spewing water all over it. His crew tried to replace the faulty radiator in the pits but they ran out of time.

Boat then begin to stretch out his lead over Ray, but on lap 196 he got caught in traffic and Ray begin to close the gap. On lap 200, the Texas native caught Boat and then made a move through the grass in the quad-oval (reminiscent of Buddy Lazier at Charlotte the previous year); as they went down the back stretch Ray split the lapped car of Buzz Calkins and swept into the lead. But on the next lap, Boat used the slingshot to retake it; Ray tried for the next six laps but could not overcome Boat's superior engine, and Billy Boat took his first IRL win. For the top three (Boat, Ray, and Bräck), it was their best IRL career finishes up to that point. Scott Sharp ran a quiet race to finish fifth and move into a tie with Stewart in the points standings. One year after apparently winning at Texas, only to have the win taken away after a scoring recount, Billy Boat won it again, and this time he got to keep the trophy.

Race Statistics
Lead changes: 21 among 6 drivers

Standings after the race

Drivers' Championship standings

 Note: Only the top five positions are included for the standings.

References

External links
IndyCar official website

1998 in IndyCar
Firestone 600
True Value
Motorsport in Texas
June 1998 sports events in the United States